Damias mixta is a moth of the family Erebidae first described by George Hampson in 1900. It is found on Misool and in New Guinea.

References

Damias
Moths described in 1900